Slawomir Kruszkowski (born 14 October 1975 in Toruń) is a Polish olympic rower.

References 

 
 

1975 births
Living people
Polish male rowers
Sportspeople from Toruń
Rowers at the 2000 Summer Olympics
Rowers at the 2004 Summer Olympics
Rowers at the 2008 Summer Olympics
Olympic rowers of Poland
World Rowing Championships medalists for Poland
European Rowing Championships medalists
21st-century Polish people